The sixteenth series of Ballando con le Stelle was broadcast from 16 October 2021 to 18 December 2021 on RAI 1 and was presented by Milly Carlucci with Paolo Belli and his Big Band.

Couples

Notes

16
2021 Italian television seasons